William Martin Croll (April 9, 1866 –   October 21, 1929) was a Democratic member of the U.S. House of Representatives from Pennsylvania.

William M. Croll was born in Upper Macungie Township, Pennsylvania. He attended Keystone State Normal School in Kutztown, Pennsylvania, and graduated from the Eastman Business College in Poughkeepsie, New York.

He taught school, and moved to Maxatawny, Pennsylvania, in 1889 and engaged in the general merchandise business. He moved to Reading, Pennsylvania, in 1897 and engaged in the retail clothing business and in banking. He was treasurer of Berks County, Pennsylvania, from 1909 to 1912.

During World War I, from 1913 to 1918, he served as naval officer at the port of Philadelphia. He was a delegate to the Democratic National Conventions in 1912 and 1920.

Croll was elected as a Democrat to the Sixty-eighth Congress, but was an unsuccessful candidate for reelection in 1924.  He resumed mercantile pursuits, died in Reading, and was interred in Laureldale Cemetery in Laureldale, Pennsylvania.

References

The Political Graveyard

1866 births
1929 deaths
Democratic Party members of the United States House of Representatives from Pennsylvania
Kutztown University of Pennsylvania alumni
People from Lehigh County, Pennsylvania
United States Navy personnel of World War I